Ola Rimstedt is a Swedish contract bridge player. Ola is a World Champion. Playing with his twin brother Mikael Rimstedt, they won the World Open Pairs in Orlando in 2018.

Bridge accomplishments

Wins
 World Youngsters Team Championship (1) 2014
 World Open Pairs (1) 2018

References

External links
 
 

Living people
Year of birth missing (living people)
Place of birth missing (living people)
Swedish contract bridge players